Ukraine participated at the 2010 Winter Olympics in Vancouver, British Columbia, Canada.

Although ahead of the start of the Olympic Games, the Ministry for Affairs of Family, Youth Policy, and Sport expected Ukrainians to win medals in figure skating, freestyle, tobogganing and skiing, the Ukrainian national team completed its performance in the Olympic Games without any medals.

Competitors
The following is the list of number of competitors participating at the Games per sport/discipline.

Alpine skiing

Men

Women

Biathlon

Men

Women

Lyudmila Pysarenko (in team but did not participate)
Lilia Vaygina-Efremova (in team but did not participate)

Cross-country skiing

Men

Women

Figure skating

Freestyle skiing

Men's team – aerials

Women's team – aerials

Luge

Doubles

Women's singles

Nordic combined

Ski jumping

Snowboarding

Men's

Women's

References

2010 in Ukrainian sport
Nations at the 2010 Winter Olympics
2010